Dorothy Dunlop (1929 – 16 October 2021) was a former Ulster Unionist and Conservative politician.

She was born in Dublin in 1929, but her family moved to Belfast when she was just four, after her father, Gilbert Waterhouse, accepted the position of Professor of German at Queen's University. She later completed a BA in English at Queen's, where she met and later married her husband, Samuel Dunlop.

Dunlop worked in the Arts Council in London and for BBC Northern Ireland. After her marriage, she worked as a teacher in various schools and for the Prison Education Service.

She was first elected as an Ulster Unionist Party (UUP) member of Belfast City Council in a by-election in 1975 for 'Area B' (the forerunner to the 'Victoria' electoral area). She was re-elected in 1977 and served as Deputy Lord Mayor in 1978–79. She lost her council seat to the Democratic Unionist Party (DUP) in 1981.

In 1982 she was elected to the Northern Ireland Assembly, one of only three women to win a seat. In 1985 she regained her seat on Belfast City Council, representing the 'Pottinger' area and became chairwoman of East Belfast Unionist Association. On the moderate wing of the UUP, she was critical of the party's electoral pact with the DUP and with Unionist demonstrations at Belfast's Saint Anne's Cathedral against the Anglo-Irish Agreement.

She left the UUP, but retained a sufficient personal vote to hold her council seat in 1989 as an independent Unionist and to retain her deposit with over 2000 votes in East Belfast in the 1992 Westminster election. Shortly afterwards, she joined the Conservative Party, becoming Area Chairwoman 1995–97.

Her political career came to an end when she lost her council seat in the 1993 Local Government elections, her last electoral contest being the 1996 Forum election where she failed to win a seat in Belfast East.

She had four children and seven grandchildren.

She died on 16 October 2021, aged 92.

References

|-

1929 births

2021 deaths
Members of Belfast City Council
Northern Ireland MPAs 1982–1986
Independent politicians in Northern Ireland
Ulster Unionist Party councillors
Conservative Party (UK) politicians
Female members of the Northern Ireland Assembly
20th-century women politicians from Northern Ireland
Women councillors in Northern Ireland